Gladys Erbetta Huri (born 28 September 1928) is an Argentine sprinter. She competed in the women's 200 metres at the 1952 Summer Olympics.

References

1928 births
Living people
Athletes (track and field) at the 1952 Summer Olympics
Argentine female sprinters
Argentine female long jumpers
Argentine female high jumpers
Olympic athletes of Argentina
Athletes (track and field) at the 1951 Pan American Games
Athletes (track and field) at the 1955 Pan American Games
Pan American Games medalists in athletics (track and field)
Pan American Games silver medalists for Argentina
Place of birth missing (living people)
Medalists at the 1955 Pan American Games
20th-century Argentine women